"Es lebe der Sport" is a song recorded in 1982 by Austrian singer Rainhard Fendrich. It reached #7 in the Austrian charts plus #54 in the German Charts. It is a humoristic song about accidents in sports.

1983 singles
Rainhard Fendrich songs
1982 songs